Marco Vorbeck (born 24 June 1981) is a German former footballer who played as a striker.

Career 
Vorbeck began his career with FC Hansa Rostock, breaking into the first-team and playing 38 Bundesliga games, before joining Dynamo Dresden in 2005. He moved on to FC Augsburg two years later, but was blighted by injuries and forced to retire in 2009. He returned to football, however, in July 2010, signing for TSV 1860 Rosenheim in the Bayernliga before retiring again a year later.

References

External links
 

1981 births
Living people
German footballers
Germany under-21 international footballers
Association football forwards
Bundesliga players
2. Bundesliga players
FC Hansa Rostock players
Dynamo Dresden players
FC Augsburg players
TSV 1860 Rosenheim players